Tarazi or Al-Tarazi  (Arabic: ترزي ، ال ترزي) is a Palestinian Christian surname from Gaza. The name is mostly found in Palestine, along with other middle eastern countries such as Syria, Lebanon, Egypt, and Jordan respectively. 

 Ezri Tarazi (born 1962), Israeli industrial designer
 Mazen Al-Tarazi, Syrian-Canadian businessman sanctioned for ties to Syrian government of Bashar al-Assad
 Michael Tarazi, Palestinian-American lawyer and former adviser to the Palestine Liberation Organization. Since 2008, Tarazi has worked for the government and policy team of the Consultative Group to Assist the Poor (CGAP), an organization that promotes microfinance.
 Philippe de Tarrazi (1865-1956), Lebanese polymath, philanthropist, founder of the National Library of Lebanon, and a founding member of the Arab Academy of Damascus
 Zuhdi Tarazi, first Ambassador, Permanent Observer of Palestine to the United Nations
 Leila Tarazi Fawaz, Lebanese historian and academician

Fictional characters:
 Zari Tarazi, a fictional character in Legends of Tomorrow
 Behrad Tarazi, a fictional character in Legends of Tomorrow